These are the results of the women's uneven bars competition, one of six events for female competitors in artistic gymnastics at the 1988 Summer Olympics in Seoul.  The qualification and final rounds took place on September 19, 21 and 25th at the Olympic Gymnastics Hall.

Results

Qualification

Eighty-six gymnasts competed in the uneven bars event during compulsory and optional rounds on September 19 and 21.  The eight highest scoring gymnasts advanced to the final on September 25.  Each country was limited to two competitors in the final.  Half of the points earned by each gymnast during both the compulsory and optional rounds carried over to the final.  This constitutes the "prelim" score.

Final

References
Official Olympic Report
www.gymnasticsresults.com

Women's uneven bars
1988 in women's gymnastics
Women's events at the 1988 Summer Olympics